Metacrambus deprinsi is a moth in the family Crambidae. It was described by Julius Ganev in 1990. It is found in Afghanistan.

References

Crambinae
Moths described in 1990
Insects of Afghanistan